Joseph Siméon may refer to:
 Joseph Jérôme Siméon, French jurist and politician
 Joseph Balthazard Siméon, his son, French politician and diplomat